Liu Wei Di Huang Wan, also known as Liuwei Dihuang teapills or Six Flavor Rehmanni, is a prescription (方剂 fāng jì) in traditional Chinese medicine and pharmacy to treat yin deficiency. In Japanese kampo, it is known as "Rokumi-gan" (六味丸  ろくみがん) (it is also known as Kampo #87). It is commonly made into Chinese patent medicine.

History
The formula was created by Qian Yi as dihuang pill (地黄丸). It was published in "Xiao'er Yao Zheng Zhi Jue" (also known as "Key to Therapeutics of Children's Diseases" or "The Correct Execution of Pediatric Medicinals and Patterns" ) in 1119 by Qian Yi's student.

The formula was altered slightly when it was borrowed as a Japanese kampo formula. Some Chinese species of herbs were replaced with herbs found in Japan. For example, Alisma plantago-aquatica was replaced with Alisma orientale for zé xiè.

Derivatives

The Liuwei Dihuang Wan is one of the most important Chinese
patent medicines, and is widely used in eastern Asia. In China, there are hundreds of medicinal manufacturers who produce Liuwei
Dihuang Wan and its derivatives. These derivatives include Zhibai Dihuang Wan, Guifu Dihuang Wan, Mingmu Dihuang Wan, Qiju Dihuang
Wan, Maiwei Dihuang Wan, and Guishao Dihuang Wan.

Chinese classic herbal formula

Japanese kampo formula

See also
Chinese herbology
Chinese patent medicine
Chinese classic herbal formula
Kampo list
Kampo herb list
Zhibai Dihuang Wan

References

Traditional Chinese medicine pills